A pelte is a light shield used by ancient Greek peltasts.

Pelte may also refer to :

 Peltae, an ancient city and Catholic titular see
 Pelte, a sweet made in Aksaray, Turkey
 Lucy Pelte (died 1900), first wife of British lawyer W. H. Lionel Cox

See also
Pelt (disambiguation)